Mijikenda is a Bantu dialect cluster spoken along the coast of East Africa, mostly in Kenya, where there are 1.9 million speakers (2009 census) but also in Tanzania, where there are 100,000 speakers. The name Mijikenda means "the nine settlements" or "the nine communities" and refers to the multiple language communities that make up the group. An older, derogatory term for the group is Nyika which refers to the "dry and bushy country" along the coast.

Varieties
The New Updated Guthrie List from 2009 lists the following varieties and Guthrie codes as part of the Mijikenda cluster:

 E72 – North Mijikenda (Nyika) 
 E72a – Giryama [nyf]
 E72b – Kauma 
 E73c – Chonyi [coh]
 E73d – Duruma [dug]
 E73e – Rabai
 E73F – Jibana
 E72G – Kambe
 E72H – Ribe 
 E73-732 – South Mijikenda 
 E73 – Digo [dig]
 E731 – Segeju [seg]
 E732 – Degere

The Degere are former hunter-gatherers like the Cushitic Waata, and are said to have once spoken a Cushitic language.

The Ethnologue lists the following variety groupings:

 [coh]  – Chonyi, Jibana
 [dug] – Duruma
 [dig] – Digo
 [nyf] – Giryama, Ribe, Kambe, Chwaka, Rabai, Kauma
 [seg] – Segeju

Ethnologue's 'Duruma' may refer to the same thing as Maho's 'Degere', as the Degere are variously reported to speak Duruma, Digo, or a similar dialect of their own.

Clicks
Clicks have been reported in ideophones from two dialects of Mijikenda: Digo and Duruma. (It is not known if they occur in the others.) These are tsya!  'scram!' and  'minute'. It is not known if these have any connection with the neighbouring Cushitic language Dahalo.

References

 Walsh, M.T. (2006). "A Click in Digo and its Historical Interpretation", Azania, 41.

Northeast Coast Bantu languages
Click languages